Starý Petřín is a municipality and village in Znojmo District in the South Moravian Region of the Czech Republic. It has about 200 inhabitants.

Administrative parts
Villages of Jazovice and Nový Petřín are administrative parts of Starý Petřín.

References

Villages in Znojmo District